Màiri nighean Alasdair Ruaidh (c.1615–c.1707), also known as Mary Macleod, was a Scottish Gaelic poet.

Life
Born at Rowdil, Harris, she was a daughter of Red Alasdair, and through him connected with the chiefs of the Macleods. In one of her poems, she claims to have nursed five lairds of the Macleods and two lairds of Applecross. Most of her life was spent at Dunvegan, Skye, in the Macleod of Macleod household. At one time, however, she was exiled by her chief to Mull for being too profuse in her praise of his relative, Sir Norman Macleod of Bernera. She was afterwards recalled to Dunvegan and died there in 1674.

Works
Only a few of her poems, mostly laudations of the Macleods, have been preserved.

Macleod is widely regarded as one of the stalwarts of the new school of poetry that was emerging in the 17th century, which eventually replaced the classical Gaelic bards.

The 1893 Encyclopædia Britannica states: "Macleod’s poetry is celebrated for its simple, natural rhythms. Her poems were full of the imagery that was customary in the verse of the bardic poets. Macleod's poems were mostly exalted tales of the heroic deeds of the Macleod family, woven with her strong love for her family... A handful of her poems remains today. Of those that survive, the elegies are the best, poignant yet fresh in their style."

Folklore

MacLeod is also referenced in Scottish folklore as composing her poetry neither indoors nor outdoors and that she would croon from the threshold.

Citations

References

Primary Sources 

 

Attribution

Scottish women poets
17th-century Scottish writers
17th-century Scottish women writers
17th-century writers
Year of birth uncertain
17th-century Scottish Gaelic poets
17th-century Scottish people
18th-century Scottish people
People from Harris, Outer Hebrides
Clan Macleod